Eubryopterella is a genus of moths of the family Erebidae. The genus was described by Roepke in 1938.

Species
Eubryopterella vaneeckei Roepke, 1938
Eubryopterella cinerea Holloway, 2005
Eubryopterella triangulata Holloway, 2005

References

Calpinae
Heteroneura genera